A headstock of a rail vehicle is a transverse structural member located at the extreme end of the vehicle's underframe.  The headstock supports the coupling at that end of the vehicle, and may also support buffers, in which case it may also be known as a buffer beam. The headstocks form part of the underframe of a locomotive or a railroad car. The headstocks of locomotives, railcars and cabcars also support headlamps and the hoses for air brakes, vacuum brakes as well as the cables for train control and head end power.

Length over headstocks 

A commonly used measurement relating to a rail vehicle is its length over headstocks, which is the length of the vehicle excluding its couplings or buffers (if any).
Alternative expressions for length over headstocks are length over coupler pulling faces, usually applied to Janney couplers, and length over buffers.

See also 

 Anticlimber
 Buff strength
 Bumper
 Crashworthiness
 Glossary of rail transport terms
 Glossary of steam locomotive components
 Pilot

References 

Locomotive parts
Rolling stock